The Colombo Plan is a regional intergovernmental organization that began operations on 1 July 1951. The organization was conceived at an international conference, The Commonwealth Conference on Foreign Affairs held in Colombo, Ceylon (now Sri Lanka) in January 1950, and was attended by the finance ministers of Australia, the United Kingdom, Canada, Ceylon, Pakistan and New Zealand, and the prime ministers of Ceylon and India. Membership has expanded significantly over the years to the current 28 governments.

The primary focus of its work is on the development of human resources in the south and southeast regions of Asia. Aid to education 1950 to 1983 came to $72 billion, of which $41 billion came from the United States.

Host country of the Colombo Plan 
The Colombo Plan enjoys a host country agreement with the Government of Sri Lanka in the form of a memorandum of understanding with privileges and immunities that are afforded by the Government of Sri Lanka.

In a speech made in Colombo on 5 July 2010, the 4th Secretary-General Dato' Patricia Yoon-Moi Chia said: "The gearing up of the level of our activities is made possible through the voluntary contributions of member countries and international agencies such as OPEC fund. Last year our programming was over US$10 million and we expect a more than US$12 million programming this year with almost another US$2 million in terms of cost-sharing from our member countries. With funding from the United States Government and 13 other member countries, the Colombo Plan is now the biggest stakeholder in drug demand reduction in the Asia-Pacific, with a special initiative in Afghanistan."

Programmes
The Colombo Plan has four programmes:
Drug Advisory Programme (DAP, estd: 1973) 
Gender Affairs Programme (GAP, estd: 2014)
Programme for Environment & Climate Change (ENV, estd: 2016)
Capacity Building Programme (CBP)

Past Programmes
Long-Term Scholarships Programme (LTSP, estd: 1951) 
Programme for Private Sector Development (PPSD, estd: 1995)
Programme for Public Administration & Environment (PPA, estd: 1995)

The Plan now
Over the years, while adhering to the concept of human resource development and South-South Cooperation in addressing issues of economic and social development, the programme content of the Colombo Plan has been changing to take account of the needs of member countries in a fast changing world economic environment. In the early years, the training programmes were more of a long-term nature, while recent programmes have been focusing on providing advanced skills and experience sharing aimed at arriving at the best practices in different fields of economic and social activities as a means of good policy making and governance. The current programmes of the Colombo Plan are in the areas of public policy formulation in an environment of globalisation and market economy, private sector development as a prime mover for growth, drug use and dependence prevention and treatment in member countries and addressing gender issues. The Colombo Plan Staff College for Technician Education located in Manila also provides skill development opportunities for technicians in middle level.

In her 2010 speech, Dato' Patricia Yoon-Moi Chia states: "The current Colombo Plan looks very different since our restructuring and revitalisation in 1995. As we continue to build upon our past successes, the new Colombo Plan uses cooperation among developing member countries or South-south Cooperation between the developed member countries and developing member countries, to underpin all our activities. Since our restructuring in 1995, we have now provided 16,082 scholarships to 23 member countries for both long-term and short-term training programmes."

Past secretaries-general
The Colombo Plan underwent an organisational transformation and renewal in 1995, and the Colombo Plan Bureau became the Colombo Plan Secretariat to be headed by the Secretary-General, instead of a Director. The first Secretary-General was Dr. Kim Hak-su from Korea (January 1995 – March 1999) who was succeeded by Dr. Sarat Chandran, India (April 1999 – June 2003), Mr. Kittipan Kanjanapitkul from Thailand (June 2003 – August 2007), Dato' Patricia Yoon-Moi Chia from Malaysia (August 2007 – August 2011), the first Asian woman to hold this position, Mr. Adam Maniku from Maldives (15 August 2011 – November 2013), Mr. Kinley Dorji from Bhutan (May 2014 – April 2018) and, Ambassador Phan Kieu Thu (May 2018 - December 2021).The incumbent Secretary-General, Dr. Benjamin P. Reyes from The Philippines assumed duties on 1 May 2022 as the organisation's 8th Secretary-General.

Notable Colombo Plan scholars
See: Category:Colombo Plan Scholars

Dr Sanduk Ruit (Nepal), founder, Himalayan Cataract Project and Tilganga Eye Hospital, Kathmandu.
Dr. Baburam Bhattarai (Nepal), former Maoist rebel and Prime Minister of Nepal.
Ong Teng Cheong (Singapore), fifth President of Singapore, former Deputy Prime Minister in Singapore.
Khaw Boon Wan (Singapore), former Cabinet Minister in Singapore.
Raymond Lim (Singapore), former Cabinet Minister in Singapore.
Yeo Cheow Tong (Singapore), former Cabinet Minister in Singapore.
Mah Bow Tan (Singapore), former Cabinet Minister in Singapore.
Dato' Hajji Abdul Ghani Bin Othman (Malaysia), former Chief Minister of Johor state in Malaysia.
Prof. Datuk Dr. Mazlan Othman, astrophysicist, Director of the United Nations Office for Outer Space Affairs.
Tan Sri Datuk Seri Panglima Joseph Pairin Kitingan (Malaysia), Deputy Chief Minister and Minister of Rural Development of Sabah.
Dr. K.V. Thiruvengadam (India), Indian physician and medical teacher.
Mapatunage James "M. J." Perera (Sri Lanka), he made broadcasting history by being the first Ceylonese Director General of Radio Ceylon, the oldest radio station in South Asia, taking over the helm from John Lampson of the BBC.
Livy Wijemanne (Sri Lanka), pioneer of Radio Ceylon.
J. Soedjati Djiwandono, Indonesian political scientist and founder of the Centre for Strategic and International Studies in Jakarta.
Chellapilla Venkata Rao, (1910–1971) Indian botanist, who worked extensively on Proteaceae, and plant embryology. He taught and worked at Andhra University. (Colombo plan scholar at University of Tasmania from 1955 to 1957).
Dr. Khai Yuen Tang (Malaysia), Medical Practitioner, Colombo plan scholar at The Alfred Hospital, Department of Pathology from 1966 to 1969.
Boediono (Indonesia), 11th Indonesia Vice President.
Pehin Sri Adenan Bin Haji Satem (Malaysia), former Chief Minister of Sarawak

Early criticism
The Plan has been criticised on various grounds. Some Asians see in it only the hand of British imperialism, especially as it is not aimed at developing national self-sufficiency. It offers an almost exclusively economic solution for problems which are also political and social. Dangerous issues such as landlordism and the organisation of labour, which invite Communist exploitation, are barely touched on, doubtless because it seemed politically inexpedient to raise such questions.

Present members
The Colombo Plan currently has 28 members.

Past members
There have been four past members of the Colombo Plan including two founding members in 1950, Canada and the United Kingdom. South Vietnam and Cambodia joined together in 1951. On 2 Jul 1976 South Vietnam was succeeded by the Socialist Republic of Vietnam which withdrew in 1978. Vietnam was a provisional member from 5 Nov 2001 to 18 Nov 2003 until it was accepted as a full member in 2004.

See also
Colombo Plan Staff College

References

Further reading
 Auletta, Alex. "A retrospective view of the Colombo Plan: Government policy, departmental administration and overseas students." Journal of higher education policy and management 22.1 (2000): 47–58.
 Lowe, David. "The Colombo Plan and 'soft' regionalism in the Asia-Pacific: Australian and New Zealand cultural diplomacy in the 1950s and 1960s" (Alfred Deakin Research Institute, 2010) online.

External links

International Organisations – The Colombo Plan

Educational organisations based in Sri Lanka
Organizations established in 1951
Foreign relations of Australia
Aid